Arthur Walls was a Scottish footballer, who played as an inside forward in the Football League for Tranmere Rovers.

References

1931 births
2006 deaths
Footballers from Glasgow
Association football inside forwards
Scottish footballers
Kilsyth Rangers F.C. players
Airdrieonians F.C. (1878) players
Tranmere Rovers F.C. players
Macclesfield Town F.C. players
Scottish Football League players
English Football League players
Scottish Junior Football Association players